Joe Rosen (December 25, 1920 – October 12, 2009) was an American comic book artist, primarily known for his work as a letterer. Over the course of his career with Marvel Comics and DC Comics, Rosen lettered such titles as The Fantastic Four, Captain America, Daredevil, Spider-Man, G.I. Joe: A Real American Hero, The Incredible Hulk, The Further Adventures of Indiana Jones, and X-Factor. He also lettered the DC/Marvel intercompany crossover book Superman and Spider-Man.

Biography
Rosen started his career in the production department of Fawcett Comics, where he worked from 1940 to 1943. He then joined DC Comics' production department, lettering at that publisher until the mid-1950s. By then he had established a prolific freelance career, including with Harvey Comics, where he was known as speedy, professional, and a "quiet fellow." Rosen lettered almost exclusively for Harvey throughout the rest of the 1950s.

In the 1960s and early 1970s, Rosen created pencil artwork for the DC Comics romance title Girls' Love Stories. From 1969 to 1971 he also drew stories for DC's Secret Hearts. In the 1960s, while continuing to letter for DC and Harvey, Rosen also lettered for Marvel Comics, occasionally in 1968–69, and regularly from 1974 onward. Beginning in the 1980s, and throughout the rest of his career, Rosen worked almost exclusively for Marvel.

In 1975 he began lettering Daredevil. Rosen would work on 127 issues of the comic over 16 years.

His brother was Sam Rosen, also a long-time Marvel Comics letterer. Joe Rosen died October 12, 2009.

Tributes 
Tom Spurgeon, the Comics Reporter:

Rick Parker, long-time letterer:

Notes

References

 Kraft, David Anthony. Comics Interview #7 (Jan. 1984).
 
 

Golden Age comics creators
Silver Age comics creators
1920 births
2009 deaths
Comic book letterers
Marvel Comics people